Mariano Serrano (born 19 February 1941) is a Mexican boxer. He competed in the men's lightweight event at the 1964 Summer Olympics. At the 1964 Summer Olympics, he defeated Abebe Mekonnen of Ethiopia, before losing to Alex Odhiambo of Uganda.

References

1941 births
Living people
Mexican male boxers
Olympic boxers of Mexico
Boxers at the 1964 Summer Olympics
Place of birth missing (living people)
Lightweight boxers